Ti Amo Chocolate is a 2012 Taiwanese romantic-comedy television series. The television drama was produced by Sanlih E-Television and Taiwan Mobile Production, starring Vanness Wu and Joanne Tseng. It also stars Michael Zhang, Wang Zi, Hsueh Shih-ling, Kuo Shu-yao, and Dou Zhi Kong. The shooting started on February 12, 2012. It was first aired on April 10, 2012 on SETTV. It ended its run on July 30, 2012.

Ge Wei Ru was nominated for the Best Supporting Actress award at the 47th Golden Bell Awards.

Synopsis
Fang Jia Hua (Vanness Wu) is the successor of his family's business. However, his dream is to open a chocolate store and be a chocolatier  in the hope of finding his long lost mother. He ends up leaving his business and his family to fulfill his dream. Hong Xi En (Joanne Tseng) is someone who spent her days slogging and taking up part-time work for her family. One day, she ends up working with Fang Jia Hua in "Ti Amo Chocolate" shop, and above all, she has to dress herself as a man for the job.

Cast

Main cast
 Vanness Wu as Fang Jia Hua 
 Joanne Tseng as Hong Xi En 
 Michael Zhang as Fang Jia Rui 
 Hsueh Shih-ling as Wei Li 
 Prince Chiu as Wang Zi Yi

Extended cast
 Ah Ben as Hong Xi Ping 
Bu Xue Liang as Su Yi Cheng 
Kuo Shu-yao as Hong Xi Hui 
Dou Zhi Kong as Lu Zheng Ting 
Lene Lai as Lu Zheng Jun
Ge Wei Ru as Ge Jia Yi 
Jian Chang as Hong Zhong Xin 
Doris Kuang as Ye Mei Ren 
Shen Meng Sheng as Fang Pei Long 
Zhou Dan Wei as Li Ru Yun 
Angie Tang as Fang Lin Wen Yue 
Zhong Xin Ling as Su Xiao Xiao 
Zhao Shun as Flower store owner
Chien Te-men as Fortune teller
Na Wei Xun as Bakery store manager

Guest cast
Lung Shao-hua as Cocoa master

Broadcast

Soundtrack

Ti Amo Chocolate Original Soundtrack (愛上巧克力 電視原聲帶) was released on May 25, 2012 by various artists under  Universal Music Taiwan. It contains twelve songs, which includes the collaboration of Lee Jun-ho from 2PM and Vanness Wu. The opening theme song is "不敗" or "Undefeatable" by Lee Jun-ho and Vanness Wu, while the ending theme song is by Jane Huang entitled "Tu Zhong" or "En Route".

Track listing

Ratings
Ti Amo Chocolate ranked sixth in its pilot episode, which is also the lowest average rating of the series. However, it gradually goes up between third and fifth spots, with a total average of 1.87. The viewers survey was conducted by AGB Nielsen.

Awards and nominations

References

External links
Ti Amo Chocolate official website on SETTV
Ti Amo Chocolate official website on Eastern Consolidated Taiwan

Eastern Television original programming
Sanlih E-Television original programming
2012 Taiwanese television series debuts
2012 Taiwanese television series endings
Taiwanese romantic comedy television series